M Is for Magic is a collection of child-friendly short fiction by Neil Gaiman.

The stories and poems were selected from previously published works, with the exception of "The Witch's Headstone", which is an excerpt from the later-published  novel, The Graveyard Book. All the stories also appeared in Coraline and Other Stories (2007) published by Bloomsbury in the UK.

Contents
 "The Case of the Four and Twenty Blackbirds" (first published in Knave, appears in Angels & Visitations)
 "Troll Bridge" (first published in Snow White, Blood Red, appears in Angels & Visitations and Smoke and Mirrors)
 "Don't Ask Jack" (first published in FAN, appears in Smoke and Mirrors)
 "How to Sell the Ponti Bridge" (first published in Imagine #24)
 "October in the Chair" (first published in Conjunctions, appears in Fragile Things) 
 "Chivalry" (first published in Grails, Quests, Visitations and other Occurrences, appears in Angels & Visitations and Smoke and Mirrors)
 "The Price" (first published as a chapbook by Dreamhaven Press, appears in Smoke and Mirrors)
 "How to Talk to Girls at Parties" (first published in Fragile Things)
 "Sunbird" (first published in Noisy Outlaws, appears in Fragile Things)
 "The Witch's Headstone" (first published in Dark Alchemy: Magical Tales from the Masters of Modern Fantasy)
 "Instructions" (first published in Wolf at the Door, appears in Fragile Things'')

References

2007 short story collections
2007 children's books
Children's short story collections
Fantasy short story collections
Short story collections by Neil Gaiman
HarperCollins books